Qasahdhere District (Qansahdhere District) is a district in the southern Bay region of Somalia. Its capital is Qansahdhere.

References

External links
 Districts of Somalia
 Administrative map of Qasahdhere District

Districts of Somalia

Bay, Somalia